Macbeth is a 1981 television film consisting of a recording of the stage play at the Vivian Beaumont Theater and shown on the ARTS cable network. Philip Anglim plays Macbeth and Maureen Anderman plays Lady Macbeth. The stage play was directed by Sarah Caldwell while Kirk Browning directed the film. The original production played from January 23, 1981, to March 8, 1981.

Cast
Philip Anglim as Macbeth
Maureen Anderman as Lady Macbeth
J. Kenneth Campbell as Macduff
John Vickery as Malcolm

References

External links 

1980s biographical drama films
1980s historical drama films
1981 films
Films based on Macbeth
Television shows based on plays
1980s English-language films
Films directed by Kirk Browning